Tepelenë District was one of the 36 districts of Albania, which were dissolved in July 2000 and replaced by 12 newly created counties. It was in the south of Albania, and its capital was the city of Tepelenë. Its territory is now part of Gjirokastër County: the municipalities of Tepelenë and Memaliaj.

History
At the Vjosa (Greek:Aoos) Narrows ("Aoi Stena") in the district, a Macedonian army barred the way to Epirus and, in 198 BC, a decisive battle, the Battle of the Aous, took place between a Roman army commanded by Consul Titus Quinctius Flamininus and the Macedonians commanded by Philip V. 
After an attempt of a truce and an inconclusive battle, a shepherd led the Roman army to a point where the Macedonians could be attacked and the Romans won the battle.

Administrative divisions
The district consisted of the following municipalities:

Buz
Krahës
Kurvelesh
Lopës
Luftinjë
Memaliaj
Memaliaj Fshat
Qendër
Qesarat
Tepelenë

References

External links
Information about Tepelenë District (in Albanian)

Districts of Albania
Geography of Gjirokastër County